Novosibirsk State University of Architecture, Design and Arts named after A. D. Kryachkov is a state university in Tsentralny District of  Novosibirsk, Russia. It was founded in 1989.

History
In 1987–1989, the Novosibirsk Architectural Institute was founded on the basis of the Faculty of Architecture of the Novosibirsk State University of Architecture and Civil Engineering.

In 1996, the institute was renamed the Novosibirsk State Academy of Architecture and Art.

In 2015, the academy was renamed the Novosibirsk State University of Architecture, Design and Arts (NSUADA).

References

Education in Novosibirsk
Tsentralny City District, Novosibirsk
Architecture schools in Russia
Educational institutions established in 1989
1989 establishments in the Soviet Union
Universities in Novosibirsk Oblast